Thomas Fenoughty (born 7 June 1941) was a professional footballer with Sheffield United and Chesterfield from 1964 to 1973, before returning to his career as a pharmaceutical chemist.

Football career 
Tom Fenoughty was signed by Sheffield United from non-league Sheffield in 1964. He made 49 appearances, scoring 4 goals, before moving to Chesterfield in 1969. He made 101 appearances (15 goals) for Chesterfield mostly in midfield.

In 1972, he retired from the full-time game, and returned to his career as a pharmaceutical chemist (he is a graduate of Manchester University) while playing part-time for Matlock Town. He played for Matlock for five years, scoring one of their four goals in their 4–0 win over Scarborough in the 1975 FA Trophy victory at Wembley Stadium, and was then their manager for four years.

Career outside football 
He is currently the northern regional manager for a pharmaceutical company.

Family 
His brothers Mick and Nick both had spells with Chesterfield F.C., and his father (also named Tom) played for York City. All three brothers played for Matlock in the FA Trophy final in 1975.

His son Mark Fenoughty is currently Chief Operating Officer at Sheffield United.

References

External links
 

1941 births
Living people
Sheffield F.C. players
Sheffield United F.C. players
Chesterfield F.C. players
Matlock Town F.C. players
Matlock Town F.C. managers
Alumni of the University of Manchester
Footballers from Rotherham
English footballers
English football managers
Association football midfielders